Shukri, alternatively Shoukri, Shoukry, Shokri, Choukri, Choucri, Chokri etc., is an Arabic name for males/females meaning "thankful". It is the masculine active participle of the Arabic verb, شَكَرَ, meaning "to be thankful". The feminine form of the name is Shukriya or Shukria (شكريّة), or Şükriye in Turkish. It can be used as either a given name or surname. A similar Arabic name is Shakir (Feminine form: Shakira).



Given name
 Choukri Abahnini (born 1960), pole vault athlete from Tunisia
 Shukri al-Asali (1868–1916), Ottoman parliamentarian and Syrian political activist
 Shukri al-Quwatli (1891–1967), president of Syria from 1943 to 1949 and from 1955 to 1958
 Choucri Atafi (born 1981), Moroccan Greco-Roman wrestler
 Chokri Belaid (1964-2013), Tunisian lawyer and politician
 Chokri El Ouaer (born 1966), former Tunisian football goalkeeper
 Shukri Ghanem (born 1942), former General Secretary of the People's Committee in Libya
 Shukri Hussein Gure (born 1978), Somali politician
 Shukri Mustafa, Egyptian Khariji
 Choukri Ouaïl, Algerian footballer
 Shoukry Sarhan (1925-1997), Egyptian actor
 Shukri Rahim, Malaysian cricketer
 Shukri Toefy (born 1984), Cape Town based film producer

Surname
 Abdel Rahman Shokry, Egyptian poet
 Ahmed Shoukry, Egyptian footballer
 Alawi Shukri, Emirati cricketer
 Andrew Wagih Shoukry (born 1990), Egyptian professional squash player
 Artin Bey Shoukry, Egyptian Foreign Minister from 1844 to 1850
 Hassan Bey Shukri, co-founded the Muslim National Associations (MNA) 
 Ibrahim Shoukry (1916–2008), Egyptian politician
 Islam Shokry, Egyptian footballer currently playing for Egyptian club "Tersana"
 Javid Shokri, Iranian footballer
 Mahmoud Shokry, chief of staff of the Egyptian Army
 Mamdouh Shoukri, seventh President and Vice-Chancellor of York University
 Mohamed Choukri (1935-2003), Moroccan author and novelist
 Mohammad Shukri (cricketer) (born 1986), Malaysian cricketer
 Monia Chokri (born 1982), Canadian actress
 Moustapha Choukri (1945-1980), Moroccan footballer
 Muhammad Shukri (1861-1919), Christian convert who became a missionary by the name of Johannes Avetaranian
 Nancy Shukri, Malaysian politician
 Peter Shoukry (born 1986), Egyptian-American model and artist
 Sameh Shoukry (born 1952), Egyptian career diplomat
 Shoukri brothers, Andre Khalef Shoukri and Ihab Shoukri, a pair of Egyptian-Northern Irish loyalist paramilitaries
 Suhaizi Shukri (born 1979), Malaysian football referee

Middle name
 Emile Shukri Habibi (1922 - 1996) Palestinian/Israeli Arab writer and communist politician
 Ezzedine Choukri Fishere (born 1966), Egyptian novelist, diplomat and academic

See also
 Shokri Kola, a village in Iran

Arabic masculine given names
Arabic-language surnames